Ludwigia peploides is a species of flowering plant in the evening primrose family known by the common names floating primrose-willow and creeping water primrose. It is native to Australia, New Zealand, North America, and South America, but it can be found on many continents and spreads easily to become naturalized. It is well known as a troublesome aquatic noxious weed that invades water ecosystems and can clog waterways. This is perennial herb which grows in moist to wet to flooded areas. The stem can creep over 2 meters long, sometimes branching. It spreads to form mats on the mud, or floats ascending in the water. The leaves are several centimeters long and are borne in alternately arranged clusters along the stem. The flower has 5 to 6 lance-shaped sepals beneath a corolla of 5 or 6 bright yellow petals up to 2.4 centimeters long. The fruit is a hard, cylindrical capsule.

Distribution
Ludwigia peploides is native to Australia, New Zealand, North America, and South America.

US Distribution
In the US it lives predominately along east and south west coast. States between Nevada, Washington, Michigan and all states north of New York do have a native species of L. peploides nor are they invasive.

European Distribution
A country that is having a serious problem with the L. peploides are the French. It is considered the most invasive alien aquatic plants in France. They have spread all across the country at such alarming rates that it has been assigned to the German Black List of invasive species. Other counties are also wary of this incredibly invasive species so there has  been a ban on the trade of L. peploides in France, Portugal, Netherlands, Belgium and the UK. These species cause serious problems in area where they have been introduced and a ban on trade will hopefully prevent any further damage.

Habitat, ecology and dispersal
The genus Ludwigia is present worldwide. There are 23 sections consisting of 82 species in total. They can be both woody, herbaceous and aquatic. They have very high levels of reproduction and efficient dispersal capacity which is a large factor in its amazing ability to take over habitats all across the world. First their reproduction. It is divided into four steps that coincide with the changing seasons. During the spring, new shoots form buds. If in shallow water, it is formed in an erect position, but if in a drained environment, they will adopt a creeping form. The stems will eventually rise to the waters surface and will then form rosettes and small round leaves. The next step occurs over the summer where apical and branches begin to form whether the species formed in an erect or creeping form. After an overall lateral extension of 50 cm flowers can begin to emerge. Between late June to early October, yellow flowers are produced and reproduction can occur. Unfortunately, the sexual reproduction of these plants are relatively unknown due to lack of research and can vary from species to species.  In autumn, from August to November fruiting occurs. For the rest of the year, the winter months, the species will break up, dry out and decay but it has been seen that there are cases where it can survive.

The reason these plants are scattered all over the globe is because Ludwigia can be generated during all seasons just from fragments of stems or rhizomes. They can be broken as easily by wind, water flow or animals. Lugwigia Peploides have the ability to double their biomass from their broken particles between 15 and 90 days. This also allows this species to continue to thrive in habitat and regions where sexual reproduction cannot occur.

The Ludwigia occur predominantly in wetlands and in the transition areas between aquatic and terrestrial environments. As a result of their high plasticity lugwigia can colonize pretty much anywhere in slow flowing waters, river banks and wet meadows. They do prefer slow flowing water over water with a higher velocity. Most Lugwigia species where present in stagnant water, from .06 to 1 metre deep. Great depths became a constraint on their development but shoots were still able to form flower buds. If they are in a low nutrient condition, Ludwigia double their biomass. The only true weakness of this species is intense levels of salinity in the water they inhabit.

Invasiveness 
In Europe, Ludwigia peploides  is included since 2016 in the list of Invasive Alien Species of Union concern (the Union list). This implies that this species cannot be imported, cultivated, transported, commercialized, planted, or intentionally released into the environment in the whole of the European Union.

Morphology
Ludwigia peploides is an herbaceous perennial wetland plant usually common along mud or a water surface. L. Peploides sprawl flat along the mud or waters surface. It is very similar to the Ludwigia Hexapetala and very difficult to tell apart. The leaves are arranged in clusters and vary in size. The average leaf is approximately 3.5 inches long and can be egg shaped to lance-shaped. They are hairless and each leaf's base tappers off to a stalk that ranges from 1 to 1.5 inches. The stem can grow as long as 9 feet and can be hairless or slightly hairy but are always have a fleshy texture.

Flowers and fruits
Ludwigia peploides flowers start from the stem which are floating or lying on the ground. Each flower has five yellow petals 1 to 1.5 cm in length. Each occur on long stalks that on each leaf axils. The fruits and seeds do not have extensive research done so the details are unclear but there are capsules that contain many seeds. Each seed is approximately 1 mm in size.

Societal impacts
The Ludwigia species cause dense mats which form a perfect protective habitat for mosquitoes. This causes higher rates of the West Nile Virus and other diseases that mosquitoes commonly spread. They are also a serious nuisance for human activity. Leisure activities such as hunting, fishing, and boating can be extremely difficult. Flood risk increases due to the decrease in channel carry capacity. The rapid and uncontrolled growth of water primrose dominates native populations and can damage irrigation and drainage networks of water bodies. Fish can have a hard time moving through these dense Ludwigia populations, which then in turn effect the habitat of surface animals such as birds.

Food
Luwigia peploides are not commonly ingested. They were traded originally for ornamental purposes.

Medicinal
Ludwigia peploides are both melliferous and polliniferous. Numerous compounds which have medicinal properties are produced by the Ludwigia species such as saponins, tannins, polyphenols, alkaloids, linoleic acids, flavonoids, starch grains and calcium oxalate crystals. There are also three medical compounds which contribute to antioxidant activities. Lastly, there is a potential for water waste management in agriculture. Because the plant can accumulate high concentrations of nitrogen in can decrease level of ammonia and nitrates in soil. Sadly, all of these are only potential uses of the plant since there has been close to no investigation of its use. Further research is required for their medicinal and agricultural benefits to be harnessed.

References

External links

Jepson Manual Treatment
A Pest of the Peconic Estuary
Alabama Plants Photo Profile
Washington State Class A Noxious Weeds
Photo gallery
Noxious Weed Control Board
 

peploides